The discography of Canadian singer Justin Bieber consists of six studio albums, three remix albums, three compilation albums, two extended plays, 75 singles (including 21 as a featured artist), and 10 promotional singles. Bieber has attained eight number-one hits on the US Billboard Hot 100 and eight number-one albums on the US Billboard 200 charts. As of June 2019, Bieber has sold an estimated 150 million records worldwide, making him one of the best-selling music artists of all time. According to the Recording Industry Association of America (RIAA), he has sold 22.5 million albums and 114 million digital singles units as a lead artist, in the United States. Bieber was named the "Greatest Pop Star of 2016" by Billboard. He was also named the Billboard Year-End Top Male Artist for 2016 and placed number seven on the magazine's Decade-End Top Artists Chart for the 2010s. 

At the age of 13, Bieber was discovered by his record executive and talent manager, Scooter Braun, on YouTube and was eventually signed by American singer-songwriter Usher to RBMG Records. Bieber's debut single, "One Time", peaked at number 12 in Canada and reached the top 20 in several other countries globally. Bieber released his debut seven-track extended play (EP), My World on November 17, 2009. It debuted at number one in Canada and reached the top 5 in several other countries, including the United Kingdom and the United States. The EP also produced the follow-up single "One Less Lonely Girl", as well as the promotional singles "Favorite Girl" and "Love Me", all of which charted within the top 40 of the US Billboard Hot 100. As a result, he became the first solo artist to have four singles chart in the top 40 of the US Billboard Hot 100 before the release of a debut album. Following the release of My World, Bieber became the first artist to have seven songs from a debut album chart on the US Billboard Hot 100.

Bieber released his debut studio album, My World 2.0, on March 19, 2010. The album was a commercial success, topping charts in various countries including Australia, Canada, and the United States. The album debuted at number one on the US Billboard 200, making Bieber the youngest solo male artist to top the chart since Stevie Wonder in 1963. My World 2.0 received multi-Platinum certifications from Music Canada (MC) and the RIAA. The album was preceded by the release of its lead single, "Baby", which features Ludacris. The song became an international hit, and is one of the highest-certified digital single of all time. It reached the top 10 in 15 countries, including a number five peak on the US Billboard Hot 100. It was followed by the singles "Somebody to Love" and "U Smile", which became US top-40 hits. On February 14, 2011, Bieber released his second remix album Never Say Never: The Remixes, which topped the charts in Canada and the United States. Its lead single, "Never Say Never", reached number eight on the US Billboard Hot 100.

Bieber released his second studio album, Under the Mistletoe, on November 1, 2011. It topped charts in Canada and the US. It became the first Christmas album by a male artist to debut at number one on the US Billboard 200. The lead single, "Mistletoe", reached the top 10 in various countries, including Canada and Denmark, and topped the US Billboard Holiday 100 Chart. Bieber released a collaboration with Mariah Carey, "All I Want for Christmas Is You (SuperFestive!)", as the second single from the album. 

Bieber released his third studio album, Believe, on June 15, 2012. It topped the charts in 16 countries and is certified 3× Platinum by the RIAA. The album's lead single, "Boyfriend", reached number one in Canada and peaked at number two in the US. Believe also produced the US top-10 singles "As Long as You Love Me" and "Beauty and a Beat", with all three singles achieving global success. On January 29, 2013, he released his third remix album, Believe Acoustic, which became his fifth number-one album in Canada and the US. Bieber became the first artist in history to have five US number-one albums at age 18. On December 23, 2013, Bieber released his second compilation album, Journals.

After a two-year music hiatus, Bieber released a collaboration with Jack Ü, "Where Are Ü Now".  It reached number eight on the US Billboard Hot 100 and earned Bieber his first Grammy Award. It was included as a promotional single on his fourth studio album, Purpose, which was released on November 13, 2015. The album debuted atop the US Billboard 200 with his career-best first-week sales, selling 522,000 copies and moving a total of 649,000 equivalent album units. Bieber released "What Do You Mean?" as the lead single from Purpose, which topped charts in 20 countries, including the United States. On September 19, 2015, Bieber became the youngest male soloist to debut at number one on the US Billboard Hot 100. He released "Sorry" and "Love Yourself" as the second and third singles from the album, which became international hits and topped charts in countries around the world. He became the first artist in history to occupy the entire top 3 of the UK Singles Chart. "Love Yourself" topped Billboards Year-End Hot 100 Chart in 2016, followed by "Sorry" at number two, and made Bieber only the third artist in history to hold the top 2 positions of the Billboard Year-End Hot 100, after the Beatles in 1964 and Usher in 2004. "Company" was released as the fourth single from Purpose in March 2016. 

Bieber diversified on numerous collaborations between 2016 and 2019, each achieving profound international success. He was co-featured on Major Lazer's single, "Cold Water", which debuted and peaked at number two on the US Billboard Hot 100. He was also featured on DJ Snake's single, "Let Me Love You", which peaked at number four on the US Billboard Hot 100. In 2017, Bieber joined Luis Fonsi and Daddy Yankee on the remix to their single, "Despacito". The "Despacito" remix helped propel the popularity of the original version of the song (which does not feature Bieber) worldwide. It tied the then-record for the most weeks at number one in US Billboard Hot 100 history, and earned Bieber his career-first Latin Grammy Award. He was co-featured on DJ Khaled's single, "I'm the One", which also topped charts globally. It debuted at number one on the US Billboard Hot 100, and was replaced at the summit by "Despacito" a week later. Hence, Bieber became the first artist in history to chart new number-one singles in consecutive weeks. He appeared on David Guetta's single, "2U" and with BloodPop on "Friends", both reaching the top 10 in numerous countries and peaking at top 20 in the US. In 2018, Bieber reunited with DJ Khaled on the latter's single, "No Brainer", which peaked at number five in the US. In 2019, he released a collaboration with Ed Sheeran, "I Don't Care", which topped charts in 28 countries, and peaked at number two in the US. The same year, he released a collaboration with Dan + Shay, "10,000 Hours", which reached number four in the US and earned Bieber his second Grammy Award. 

Bieber released his fifth studio album, Changes, on February 14, 2020. It debuted atop the US Billboard 200, selling 126,000 pure copies and moving a total of 231,000 equivalent album units. He became the youngest solo artist to achieve seven number-one albums in the US, breaking a 59-year-old record set by Elvis Presley. The album produced two top-5 singles: "Yummy", and "Intentions". The same year, Bieber released a collaboration with Ariana Grande, "Stuck with U", which debuted atop the US Billboard Hot 100. Later that year, he released a collaboration with Shawn Mendes, "Monster", which debuted at number eight on the US Billboard Hot 100. 

Bieber released his sixth studio album, Justice, on March 19, 2021. It debuted atop the US Billboard 200, moving a total of 154,000 album-equivalent units. Thus, he became the youngest soloist to have eight US number-one albums, breaking yet another chart record held by Elvis Presley since 1965. The album's fifth single, "Peaches", debuted at number one in the US, making Bieber the first male soloist in history to simultaneously debut a single and an album at number one in the US. The album also includes three top-10 singles: "Holy", "Anyone", and "Ghost". It also produced two successful top-20 singles: "Lonely" and "Hold On". Later that year, Bieber released a collaboration with the Kid Laroi, "Stay", which topped charts in 24 countries, including the US where it became his eighth number-one single. Bieber joined Wizkid on a remix of the latter's single, "Essence", which reached number nine on the US Billboard Hot 100.

Albums

Studio albums

Remix albums

Compilation albums

Extended plays

Singles

As lead artist

As featured artist

Notes
 1: Uses data combined with the original version to obtain peak chart position.

Promotional singles

Other charted songs

Guest appearances

Notes

References

External links
 Official website
 Justin Bieber at AllMusic
 
 

Discography
Pop music discographies
Discographies of Canadian artists